Toma de Mercedes was the takeover of the city of Mercedes, Uruguay by the Ejército Blanco under the command of Timoteo Aparicio on August 25, 1870, during the Revolution of the Lances in the Banda Oriental.

Prominent Blancos officers including Anacleto Medina and Gerónimo Amilivia served in  the revolutionary army. Among the leaders of the Colorado party who took part in the defense of the city was Juan Idiarte Borda, future Uruguayan president.

References 

Battles involving Uruguay
Conflicts in 1870
History of Uruguay
Soriano Department